Foodgod (born Jonathan Cheban; 21 February 1974) is an American reality television personality, entrepreneur and former publicist. He has made appearances on the show Keeping Up with the Kardashians and its spinoffs.

Early life
Cheban was born in Moldova, Soviet Union in 1974, the only child of a real-estate agent mother, Galina, and a diamond-dealer father, Mikhail who died in 2011. He grew up in Fort Lee, New Jersey and attended Fort Lee High School before graduating from Hofstra University with a communications degree in 1995. Cheban is of Russian Jewish background.

Cheban was in a serious forklift accident at the age of 8, which resulted in him losing his front teeth and part of his tongue.

Career

Publicist
After graduation, Cheban began working for publicist Peggy Siegal at her firm in New York. At one point, music manager Benny Medina called Siegal to work on Sean Combs' 29th birthday party. When Siegal rejected the offer despite Cheban's urging, Cheban accepted the job himself. Cheban left Siegal and formed his own public-relations firm with two other publicists. He left that company in 2001, and went on to found his own firm, CommandPR.

Reality television
Cheban first gained public attention with his appearance on the reality show Keeping Up with the Kardashians, appearing as a friend of the Kardashian sisters. He subsequently appeared in several episodes of the show's spin-offs, Kourtney and Kim Take New York, Kourtney and Kim Take Miami and Kourtney and Khloé Take The Hamptons.

In 2010, Cheban starred in his own reality show, The Spin Crowd, chronicling the lives of Cheban, Simon Huck and their employees at his firm. The series' executive producer was reality-TV star Kim Kardashian. It was canceled after one season due to poor ratings.

Cheban's relationship with Kardashian has remained in the public spotlight. In 2012, Cheban made a short video spoofing himself as someone living in the shadow of Kardashian's fame.

In January 2016, Cheban entered the Celebrity Big Brother 17 house in the U.K., to compete as a housemate on its 17th season. He voluntarily left the show within days, which he finished 15th place.

In 2017, Cheban appeared on the second season of U.K.'s "Celebs Go Dating".

Other ventures
In 2008, Cheban launched his own clothing line, Kritik. Cheban also has designed jewelry for RichRocks. In late 2012, Cheban opened Sushi MiKasa, a restaurant in Miami. 
On November 24, 2013, Cheban also co-hosted Coca-Cola Red Carpet Live!, a pre-show to the 2013 American Music Awards. In January 2014, Cheban launched a product called Glam Screen, which is both a protective cover for a smart phone, as well as a mirror.

In 2014, Cheban launched TheDishh, an entertainment and life-style website that features what Cheban and his team consider to be the highest-quality foods, gadgets and entertainment.

In February 2015, Cheban opened the fast food restaurant Burger Bandit in Lynbrook, New York, on Long Island.

In late 2019 Cheban launched the podcast Foodgod: OMFG!

Personal life
In late 2012, Cheban began dating stylist Anat Popovsky after meeting her while filming Kourtney and Kim Take Miami. Cheban signed on as a single man on the second episode of the seventh season of Millionaire Matchmaker, which aired on December 12, 2013 on Bravo.

In October 2019, various media outlets announced he had changed his legal name to his social media handle, Foodgod, after starting the process in January.

Filmography

References

External links
Founder of website

1974 births
American chief executives
Hofstra University alumni
Living people
American public relations people
20th-century American Jews
American people of Russian-Jewish descent
Russian Jews
People from Fort Lee, New Jersey
Fort Lee High School alumni
21st-century American Jews